Marc Goldberg is a French theatre director, playwright, actor, and translator.

Biography
Goldberg studied Philosophy before joining the Compagnie des Théâtrophages and his first play, Les Rendez-vous, was staged in 1993.

As a theatre director, Goldberg has staged around 25 shows, including Le Bébé by Marie Darrieussecq with pop icon Lio, A Woman of Mystery by John Cassavetes with Myriam Boyer which he translated from English to French, and Anthology of Black Humor by André Breton with Bernard Menez and Patrick d'Asumçao.

His play Frickstein's Pillar was selected by the Comédie-Française reading committee.

Goldberg has been an assistant professor at ENSATT and Sciences Po before moving to Singapore in 2013, where he has been part-time Lecturer at Nanyang Academy of Fine Arts and Lasalle College of the Arts.

He was the first to translate and stage Singapore plays in French, for the Singapore Festival in France 2015: Emily of Emerald Hill by Stella Kon and The Coffin Is Too Big For The Hole by Kuo Pao Kun. Both translations were published in France by Editions Les Cygnes.

Since moving to Singapore, he has been working closely with Jean Lambert-wild, creating Swamps Clown at 72-13 (TheatreWorks' venue) in 2016 and a poetical karaoke during the 2017 Voilah! festival.

His play Scents of Josephine was staged by Samzy Jo at the Drama Center Black Box in 2017.

In 2019, he wrote the dialogues and co-wrote the script of The Brook's Clown, a graphic-photo-novel designed by Koh Hong Teng and published by Achates 360. The album was nominated for Book of the Year and Best Book Cover Design at the 2020 Singapore Book Awards. It won the Publication Gold Medal and the Illustration And Type Gold Medal at the 2020 Hong Kong Design Awards.

He has staged The Veil of Happiness by Georges Clemenceau, with incidental music Gabriel Fauré, at the Ngee Ann Kongsi Theatre in Singapore, with Lim Yu-Beng, Janice Koh, Hossan Leong and Remesh Panicker in the main roles, for the opening of the 2020 Voilah! Festival.

Main shows 
 1998 : Bastien und Bastienne by W. A. Mozart
 1999 : Delphine et Noémie
 2000 : Toute seule by Delphine Lacouque
 2001 : Carmen et Luis by Marc Goldberg
 2001 : Douce Violence by Raphaël Scheer
 2001 : Trans-Atlantique by Witold Gombrowicz
 2002 : Dieu me pardonne ! adapted from medieval Muslim poets
 2002 : Le Jeu d'Adam and La Farce du cuvier
 2003 : Un caprice de Bonaparte by Stefan Zweig
 2003 : Le Café des roses by Carine Lacroix
 2004 : Le Bébé by Marie Darrieussecq
 2006 : Le Roux dans la bergerie by Raphaël Scheer
 2006 : A Woman of Mystery by John Cassavetes
 2007 : Hors forfait by Delphine Lacouque et Noémie and Lattre
 2008 : Anthologie de l'humour noir d'André Breton
 2014 : Le fils de mon père est le père de mon fils, ou Mais que faisais-tu ? by Bertrand Marie Flourez
 2015 : Emilie d'Emerald Hill by Stella Kon and Le cercueil est trop grand pour la fosse by Kuo Pao Kun
 2015 : Lower Depths by Maxim Gorky
 2016 : Le Clown des Marais by Jean Lambert-wild (co-created with Jean Lambert-wild)
 2016 : In the Company of Women by Verena Tay
 2017 : Chalk Circle[s], adapted from Chalk Circle by Li Qianfu and The Caucasian Chalk Circle by Bertold Brecht, in Mandarin and English
 2017 : Further North, Deepest South by Chong Tze Chien
2020 : The Veil of Happiness by Georges Clemenceau
2020 : La Chanson de Roland, with Jean Lambert-wild and Lorenzo Malaguerra

Main texts 
 1992 : Les Rendez-vous staged by Fabrice de la Patellière and Alexandre de la Patellière
 2003 : Avec douleur, s'il vous plaît ! staged by Marc Goldberg
 2009 : La Colonne de Frickstein, published by Éditions Les Cygnes
 2017 : Scents of Josephine staged by Samzy Jo
2019 : The Brook's Clown, with Koh Hong Teng and Jean Lambert-wild, published by Achates 360
2019 : Les Cocottes en Sucettes, staged by Lorenzo Malaguerra

Main translations 
 1996 : Cahier Bleu and Cahier Brun by Ludwig Wittgenstein, with Jérôme Sackur, published by Gallimard
 2006 : A Woman of Mystery by John Cassavetes, with Louise Vincent
 2014 : Les Troyennes by Mark Ravenhill, published by Les Solitaires Intempestifs
 2015 : Deux Monologues Singapouriens, Emilie d'Emerald Hill by Stella Kon and Le cercueil est trop grand pour la fosse by Kuo Pao Kun, published by Éditions Les Cygnes
 2017 : Aegri Somnia by Jean Lambert-wild
 2017 : Hors du Sommeil et de l'Ombre and La Nuit de Simhat Torah by Peter Barnes, with Gisèle Joly, public reading at Théâtre Nouvelle Génération in Lyon
 2017 : The Reunification of the two Koreas by Joël Pommerat, staged reading by Jacques Vincey at 72-13 for the 2017 Voilah! festival
2020 : La Chanson de Roland, with Jean Lambert-wild, published by Les Solitaires Intempestifs

Main roles 
 2012 : The Professor in Un destin résolument moderne by David Ajchenbaum (theatre)
 2014 : William Farquhar in Lines Divide by Kent Chan (art video)
 2014 : Dr Barak Al Hadad in Firasat, season 1 et 2, on Mediacorp Suria (TV series)
 2015: William in Selfie de Mikael Teo (feature movie)
 2016 : Smusse in Swamps Clown (theatre)
 2016 : Mr Boyce in Crimewatch, episode 3 on Mediacorp (TV series)
 2017 : Emilio in Menantu International, season 2, episode 8 and 9, on Mediacorp Suria (TV series)
2019 : Doktor Graff in Les Cocottes en Sucettes, Théâtre du Crochetan in Switzerland

References

External links 
 
 
 

Writers from Paris
1968 births
Living people
French theatre directors
20th-century French dramatists and playwrights